Luis Roberto García Díaz-Granados was a Colombian politician and two time Governor of the Department of Cesar. He also served as Viceminister of Labor and Social Safety under the administration of President Julio César Turbay Ayala.

Governor of Cesar
García's first term was as interim governor appointed by President Carlos Lleras Restrepo to replace his predecessor Alfonso López Michelsen for whom García worked with, as his Secretary of Government. He served as interim governor between August 15, 1968, and September 20 of the same year.

His second term was a full term appointment between August 14, 1974, and March 13, 1975, appointed by his predecessor and then President of Colombia Alfonso López Michelsen.

(1974–1975) Cabinet
Secretary of Government: Gustavo Casado
Secretary of Finance: Eugenio Felipe Sanchez
Secretary of Development: Lucas Monsalvo Villazon
Secretary of Education: Amadeo Rodriguez Queruz
Chief of Planning: Luis Eduardo Vides Gomez
Chief of Judicial Bureau: Alfonso Daza Fuentes
Secretary General: Mendelson Ruiz Vence

References

Colombian governors
Governors of Cesar Department
Colombian Conservative Party politicians
Living people
Year of birth missing (living people)